Johnny Anker Hansen (born 11 July 1966), known simply as Johnny Hansen, is a Danish former association football player. Born in Odense, he played as a midfielder for Danish clubs Odense BK, Silkeborg IF, and Esbjerg fB, as well as Ajax Amsterdam in the Netherlands. He played 12 games for the Denmark national football team from 1986 to 1991, and was a part of the Danish squad at the 1995 King Fahd Cup. He also represented the Denmark national under-21 football team.

External links
Danish national team profile
Danish Superliga statistics

1966 births
Living people
Danish men's footballers
Denmark under-21 international footballers
Denmark international footballers
Danish Superliga players
Eredivisie players
Odense Boldklub players
AFC Ajax players
Silkeborg IF players
Esbjerg fB players
Danish expatriate men's footballers
Expatriate footballers in the Netherlands
Danish expatriate sportspeople in the Netherlands
Footballers from Odense
Association football midfielders